Reza Zafari (born ) is an Iranian-born American private wealth advisor. He is a managing director at Merrill.

Early life and education
Zafari was born in Iran, but emigrated to the United States due to the Iranian Revolution, where he attended Pomona College and studied economics.

Career

Personal life
Zafari is a trustee of Pomona.

References

External links
Profile at Forbes

American people of Iranian descent
American financial businesspeople
Pomona College alumni
Pomona College trustees
1960 births

Living people
Year of birth uncertain